Cheadle and Gatley are towns in the Metropolitan Borough of Stockport, Greater Manchester, England.  The towns, together with the areas of Cheadle Hulme and Heald Green, contain 37 listed buildings that are recorded in the National Heritage List for England.  Of these, one is listed at Grade I, the highest of the three grades, two are at Grade II*, the middle grade, and the others are at Grade II, the lowest grade.  The area is largely residential, most of the listed buildings are houses and associated structures, and the other listed buildings include churches and items in churchyards, a public house, two hospitals, a school, a railway viaduct, a memorial fountain, and four war memorials.


Key

Buildings

References

Citations

Sources

Lists of listed buildings in Greater Manchester
Buildings and structures in the Metropolitan Borough of Stockport
Listed